June Esther Bacon-Bercey (née Griffin, October 23, 1928 – July 3, 2019) was an American international expert on weather and aviation who worked for the National Oceanic and Atmospheric Administration, the National Weather Service and the Atomic Energy Commission.

She was the first African-American woman to earn a degree in meteorology and was the first female TV meteorologist trained in the field of meteorology in the United States.

Early life and education
Bacon-Bercey was born and raised in Wichita, Kansas in 1928. Her father was an attorney and her mother a music teacher. Her father died when she was young, and her mother remarried and moved to Florida, leaving her to be raised by an aunt and uncle. She was an only child that enjoyed bike riding, hiking, playing the piano, and participating in Girl Scouts activities. A high school physics teacher is credited for noticing Bacon-Bercey’s interest in water displacement and buoyancy and encouraging her to pursue a career in meteorology.

She first attended a private college close to home with an intent to major in math, but she left Friends University after two years to pursue a degree in meteorology. She then attended and earned her bachelor's degree in 1954 from the University of California, Los Angeles (UCLA), which at that time was one of the few schools in the nation to offer a four-year degree in atmospheric science. She faced opposition and discouragement in her pursuit of her meteorology degree, as she stated during a 1977 interview for a Baltimore Sun article, "When I chose my major, my adviser, who is still at U.C.L.A., advised me to go into home economics... I got a D in home economics and an A in thermodynamics.” Bacon-Bercey became the first African American woman to be conferred a meteorology degree from UCLA.

She earned a Masters of Public Administration (MPA) from the Journalism School of University of Southern California in 1979. At the age of 59, she earned a teaching credential to be able to serve as a county relief teacher for elementary and high school math and science courses until she was in her 80s, with her last assignments at Westmoor High School in Daly City, California.

Career
Shortly after graduation, Bacon-Bercey moved to Washington DC for a position as a weather analyst and forecaster with the National Meteorological Center, now known as the National Oceanic and Atmospheric Administration's National Weather Service.

Bacon-Bercey continued her career as an engineer, when she worked for the Sperry Corporation, then worked for a variety of federal organizations including the United States Atomic Energy Commission. She accepted a position as a senior adviser at the Atomic Energy Commission in 1959 because of her interests to better understand the effects of hydrogen and atomic bombs on Earth’s atmosphere. While in this role, she studied fallout patterns caused by nuclear detonations.

In the 1960s, Bacon-Bercey rejoined NOAA in its New York City offices as a radar meteorologist.

In 1971, she joined WGR-TV as a news reporter, in which role she covered the Attica Prison riot. In 1972, she became the station's on-air meteorologist after the previous meteorologist was arrested for bank robbery. She quickly became the station's chief meteorologist.

Beginning in 1979, Bacon-Bercey spent nearly ten years as the chief administrator for Television Weather Activities at the National Oceanic and Atmospheric Administration (NOAA) and worked on a number of other projects.

Increasing the participation of African-American women in meteorology and geophysical science was a major focus for Bacon-Bercey. In 1978, she published an analysis of African-American meteorologists in the US. She had won $64,000 as a contestant on The $128,000 Question in 1977, which she used to establish a scholarship fund for young women interested in atmospheric sciences, administered by the American Geophysical Union (AGU). From 1978-1990, 13 women (12 graduate students, 1 undergraduate student) received $400-$500 of scholarship money from AGU's June Bacon-Bercey Scholarship in Atmospheric Sciences for Women. This scholarship is restarting in 2021.

Bacon-Bercey served on the AGU's Committee on Women and Minorities in Atmospheric Sciences, and co-founded the American Meteorological Society's Board on Women and Minorities. Warren M. Washington is another founding member of the AWS Board on Women and Minorities. In addition, she served on the board of directors of the National Consortium for Black Professional Development.

In 2006, Bacon-Bercey was featured in a book for young people, June Bacon-Bercey: a meteorologist talks about the weather.

Honors

Bacon-Bercey was the first woman, as well as the first African-American, to be awarded the American Meteorological Society's Seal of Approval for excellence in television weathercasting when she was working at WGR in Buffalo, New York in the 1970s.

In 2000, she was honored during a three-day conference at Howard University for her contributions including: helping to establish a meteorology lab at Jackson State University in Mississippi, her endowment of the scholarship, and her work in California's public schools. Bacon-Bercey was also named a Minority Pioneer for Achievement in Atmospheric Sciences by NASA.

Personal life
Bacon-Bercey was married three times to Walker Bacon Jr., John Bercey and George Brewer. She had two daughters.

Bacon-Bercey died under hospice care in Burlingame, California from frontotemporal dementia on July 3, 2019 at the age of 90. Her death was announced six months later.

References

Jackson State University people
National Oceanic and Atmospheric Administration personnel
2019 deaths
1928 births
20th-century American scientists
21st-century American scientists
21st-century American women scientists
20th-century American women scientists
University of Southern California alumni
University of California, Los Angeles alumni
Scientists from Kansas
People from Wichita, Kansas
Women meteorologists
American television meteorologists
American television journalists
American women television journalists
20th-century African-American women
20th-century African-American scientists
21st-century African-American women
National Weather Service people
Deaths from dementia in California
Deaths from frontotemporal dementia